, also known as Honjo Ekō-in, is a Pure Land Buddhist temple in Ryōgoku, Tokyo.

History
On March 2, 1657, the Great Fire of Meireki destroyed 60 to 70% of the city of Edo (Tokyo) and killed about 100,000 people. The shōgun Tokugawa Ietsuna wished to commemorate the victims of the fire, most of whom were not survived by relatives.
A temple for prayers to Amida Buddha was built at the same time. This was the origin of the Ekō-in, which today continues to offer a resting place for any soul who did not leave relatives behind, including victims of natural disasters, prisoners, and animals.

Sumo
The temple was known as a sumo wrestling venue during the Edo and Meiji periods. The kanjin-zumō, a charity fund raising event permitted by the Tokugawa shogunate and the origin of the current professional sumo, was first held in the temple in September 1768. The temple was the site of all tournaments from October 1833 to 1909. These 76 years are known as the period of "Ekō-in sumō". A large, two-story temporary facility was built next to the temple for the sumo matches.

In 1909, the tournaments were moved into the original Ryōgoku Kokugikan, a modern arena in the temple precincts that had a capacity of 13,000 spectators and that was nicknamed as the Great Iron Umbrella. This contributed to the popularity of the sport by making it possible to hold sumo tournaments regardless of the weather. Today it has become a place where apprentice wrestlers come to pray for power.

After World War II, sumo tournaments moved to various venues in Tokyo and then to the Kuramae Kokugikan arena in Taitō, Tokyo, before returning to the Ryōgoku district in 1985. The current Ryōgoku Kokugikan arena is located only about 400 meters from the temple.

Famous people buried at the temple
 Takemoto Gidayū (1651–1714), a Jōruri chanter
 Santō Kyōden (1761–1816), an artist of the Edo period
 Nezumi Kozō (1797–1832), a thief and folk hero

References

External links

 Ekōin official website
 

Buddhist temples in Tokyo
Pure Land temples
Sumo venues in Japan
Buildings and structures in Sumida, Tokyo